Ushkyn-Iskra Astana Sport Club PC NSC RK is a futsal club based in Nur-Sultan. The club was founded in 1999 and its pavilion is the Alatau Sportcomplex.

History
The club was founded in 1999 under the name of "Iskra". The victory in the first league of Kazakhstan became the first success. In a season of 1999/00, debuted in the championship of Kazakhstan and took the seventh place. The bronze medal of the Cup of Kazakhstan in 2009 was won.

Performances in Championat of Kazakhstan

Players

Honours
 Kazakhstani Futsal Cup 
Bronze (1): 2009

Futsal clubs established in 1999
1999 establishments in Kazakhstan
Futsal clubs in Kazakhstan